Lusiana (Cimbrian / German: Lusaan) is a small town in the province of Vicenza, Veneto, Italy, in the comune of Lusiana Conco.

The small town is the birthplace of Sonia Maino Gandhi, widow of Rajiv Gandhi, the former prime minister of India.  She was born in a neighborhood called “Màini”  where families with the family name  “Màino” had been living for many generations.

References

External links

Cities and towns in Veneto